Curaçao punch is a cocktail that comes from Harry Johnson's New and Improved Bartender's Manual (1882). Dale DeGroff, a notable bartender and author of The Craft of the Cocktail (Clarkson Potter, 2002), holds this to be his favorite forgotten potation.

Preparation 
Preparation involves combining the sugar, lemon juice, and soda water, dissolving the sugar, pouring the drink into a glass with finely-shaved or crushed ice and then adding the remaining ingredients. The drink is then stirred and may be garnished with a variety of fruits.

1/2 tablespoon (7 ml) sugar
(This indulged the major nineteenth-century sweet tooth-alter to taste.)
2 or 3 dashes fresh lemon juice
(More of this can also compensate for the sweetness.)
1 ounce (1/4 gill, 3 cl) soda water
1 ounce (1/4 gill, 3 cl) brandy (Johnson calls for Martell cognac.)
2 ounce (1/2 gill, 6 cl) orange curaçao
1 ounce (1/4 gill, 3 cl) Jamaican rum
(Dale suggests a full-bodied style of rum.)

See also
 List of cocktails

References 

Cocktails with brandy
Cocktails with rum
Cocktails with triple sec or curaçao
Cocktails with lemon juice